The Secret Saturdays: Beasts of the 5th Sun is an action video game developed by High Voltage Software and 1st Playable Productions and released in 2009 for the Nintendo DS, PlayStation 2, PlayStation Portable, and Wii consoles. The game is based on the Cartoon Network animated television series The Secret Saturdays created by Jay Stephens.

Plot
The game begins as Zak and Fiskerton are watching Weird World. Argost introduces his show with a rambling about being afraid of the dark. He states that the Aztecs believe that we have burned through 4 suns already and we live under a 5th sun or as he calls it the "Sun of the 8 Beasts". According to the Aztecs there will never be a sixth sun and closes with "Are you afraid of the dark NOW." Mere moments later, the Screens flash intruder alert and Drew tells Zak to stay but Doc asks that he helps check out the place. Using Cryptids that had broken into the facility specifically a Cafre and Fiskerton to fight off some of Argost's minion's. Shortly thereafter Zak fights a Kingstie as a mini boss followed by Van Rook (who had stolen files on various Cryptids) as the main boss.

Using the data Van Rook accessed, the Saturday's calculated that his buyer wanted information on Cryptids such as the Adaro. Upon arriving at the glacier, Zak is attacked by a mixture of Argost's men and Shoji Fuzen's men (who were apparently under the control of neural parasites) but used a Waheela to defeat them and used an Adaro to fight off Tatzelwurms and Komodo to help navigate difficult terrain. Upon completing the level, Zak is met by Munya who has broken off the horn from an either dead or unconscious Adaro.

Next the family locates a strange totem that draws in Cryptids like a "super natural dog whistle" and locate 7 more worldwide and proceeds to collect the nearest one. The Saturdays go to a totem in the Amazon where they once again encounter cryptids. After fighting off more men with the help of an Orange-Eyes and using Fiskerton to navigate difficult terrain, Argost kidnaps the Orange-Eyes. Zak tries to catch up with Argost on Zon but to no avail.

Back at the airship, Zak tries to convince his parents to go after Argost and the Orange Eyes, but Doc states that they have to beat Argost to the other Cryptids he's after. Doc states that he's manage to retrieve more data from what Van Rook Stole and they all fall into 8 Geographic locals. This makes Zak believe this has something to do with the Sun of the 8 Beasts and they move on to the nearest area in the pattern. At an active volcano where the next beast, the burning man, is supposed to live, Doc and Drew tell Zak to stay put, but he goes in after Pietro "Piecemeal" Maltese scares off Fiskerton and Komodo. After fighting through the Cryptids in the volcano and Piecemeal, the volcano is about to erupt with Piecemeal stealing the Burning Man apparently with the intention of eating him. Zak must run away with Zon.

Zak studies Argost's ramblings from the intro and spots a cameo of the Azazel, a goat-like cryptid. Zak tells his parents but when they asked where Zak learned about the Azazel, he stated that he was studying when he found it. The family goes to Egypt to pick it up after a series a mini-games which mainly involves protecting the Azazel from the Blemyah. Doc Manages to Pick it up.

Next the Saturday Family goes to China. Drew and Doc get caught up in studying the nearby temple and leaves Zak to look for the next Cryptid. Curiously Zon, Fiskerton, and Komodo are once again put under the spell of a totem until Drew broke them out of it. Zak encounters the Wampus cat, and Doyle, and it is made clear that Fuzen's mind controlled minions are after its evidence by putting it in a cage repeatedly. After Doyle and Zak free the cat, Doc comes in to pick it up.

Next the team arrive in an underwater city. Doc believes they have arrived first because there's no structural damage aside from salt water erosion. Through the use of a Morgawr and Orobon, they find the Con-Rit (one of the 8 Beasts). Munya arrives on the scene and Zak uses the Con-rit to beat Munya. However the fight has broken the back of the city and Zak swims to the surface with the Con-Rit.

Doc analyzes a section of the Con-Rit's armor while Zak reveals that he swiped Munya's list of cryptids. For the oddest reason the list only details 7 of the 8 beasts. The only one left to go being a Kikiyaon with the word "Finster" mentioned. Zak suggests that the list refers to Baron Finster. Doyle states that if Finster does have the Kikiyaon, then it is in a research lab in the desert. Through using the Cryptids in the lab and even the Kikiyaon itself, Finster's men and Finster himself are defeated. After his defeat, Finster informs the family that he's already sent the Kikiyaon to Argost.

The Family goes back to base only to see Argost getting away with the Cryptids they rescued. They know Argost will be after the final Cryptid and suspect that it is in an Aztec temple. After fighting his way to the temple, Drew realizes too late that it is a trap. Argost locks Zak in an Aztec booby trap and takes his claw then releases Zak into a Cryptid infested jungle intended to let the Cryptids finish him off but they fail.

The family storms Weird World in a last-ditch effort to rescue the kidnapped Cryptids and Zak's claw. However, due to a booby trap triggered by Fiskerton, Zak is separated from his family. After solving over a dozen puzzles using cryptids living in and around Argost's mansion, Zak finally gets the Claw back just in time for a boss fight with Argost, which reveals that Argost has already concentrated the seven cryptids powers into a large sun like sphere. Zak is eventually able to defeat Argost. Sadly he triggers a booby trap that adds the claw's power to the Seven cryptids. Zak and Doyle are able to just narrowly retrieve the claw before the sun sphere detonates and everyone is rudely ejected from the mansion via another booby trap. The game ends with Argost optimistically stating that tomorrow is another Apocalypse.

Cast
 Sam Lerner - Zak Saturday
 Phil Morris - Solomon "Doc" Saturday
 Nicole Sullivan - Drew Saturday
 Diedrich Bader - Fiskerton
 Fred Tatasciore - Komodo, Munya, Zon
 Corey Burton - V.V. Argost, Leonidas Van Rook
 Will Friedle - Doyle Blackwell

Reception

The PSP version received "generally favorable reviews", and the DS and Wii versions received "mixed" reviews, while the PlayStation 2 version received "generally unfavorable reviews", according to the review aggregation website Metacritic.

References

External links
 Official website
 
 

2009 video games
D3 Publisher games
The Secret Saturdays
Nintendo DS games
PlayStation 2 games
PlayStation Portable games
Video games based on animated television series
Video games developed in the United States
Wii games
Video games with 2.5D graphics
Cartoon Network video games
Video games with cel-shaded animation
High Voltage Software games
Single-player video games
1st Playable Productions games